Popov is a crater on the far side of the Moon, just beyond the eastern limb. However even at such times it is not prominent and can only be viewed edge-on.

Description 

This crater lies due south of Dziewulski, and the crater chain designated Catena Dziewulski passes just to the northeast of Popov's outer rim. Just to the southeast of Popov lies Möbius, and the two are joined together by a smaller crater that lies along the south-southeast rim of Popov. To the southwest lies the crater Ginzel and Mare Marginis.

Popov is a worn crater with a damaged outer rim that is little more than a circular, jumbled series of ridges in the surface. Several small craterlets lie along the rim and inner wall, particularly along the western side. The interior floor is otherwise relatively level and nearly without any features.

It is named after Russian physicist Alexander Stepanovich Popov, who is considered to be the inventor of radio in his homeland and eastern European countries.

Satellite craters 

By convention these features are identified on lunar maps by placing the letter on the side of the crater midpoint that is closest to Popov.

See also 
 3074 Popov, asteroid

References 
 

 
 
 
 
 
 
 
 
 
 
 
 

Impact craters on the Moon